Michael Gwynne Douglas Davys (192212 June 2002), was a British psychiatrist in Harrow on the Hill, who specialised in depression in children. In 1945, while studying medicine at Guy's Hospital, he assisted at Bergen-Belsen concentration camp as a voluntary medical student.

See also
List of London medical students who assisted at Belsen

References

External links 

 "RoyalNavalReserve". Supplement to the London Gazette (1967)

20th-century British medical doctors
London medical students who assisted at Belsen
1945 in medicine
1922 births
2002 deaths